The National Radio Foundation (Ethniko Idryma Radiofonias, EIR), was the main public state broadcaster of Greece from 1945 until 1970.

The agency was founded in 1945, following liberation from the Axis occupation of Greece, as the successor of the occupation-era Hellenic Radio Limited Company (AERE) and the pre-war Radio Broadcast Service (YRE). EIR was one of 23 founding broadcasting organisations of the European Broadcasting Union in 1950. It started offering television services in 1966, the same year that the second public broadcaster, the military-run Armed Forces Television (TED), also began operations. In 1970 EIR became the National Radio Television Foundation until 1987, when it and ERT2, TED's successor, were amalgamated into the Hellenic Broadcasting Corporation (ERT).

1945 establishments in Greece
1970 disestablishments in Greece
Defunct television channels in Greece
Defunct radio stations in Greece